Neocrepidodera spectabilis is a species of flea beetle from a leaf beetle family that can be found in Italy and Switzerland.

References

Beetles described in 1904
Beetles of Europe
spectabilis
Endemic fauna of Italy